Telangiectasia macularis eruptiva perstans is persistent, pigmented, asymptomatic eruption of macules usually less than 0.5 cm in diameter with a slightly reddish-brown tinge.

See also
 Mastocytosis
 Skin lesion
 List of cutaneous conditions

References

External links 

 

Dermal and subcutaneous growths